The Harton House is a historic house at 1821 Robinson Avenue in Conway, Arkansas. It is a large, irregularly massed -story wood-frame house with a hip roof and clapboard siding. The roof is studded with cross gables exhibiting a half-timbered appearance, and a single-story porch wraps around the front and side, supported by brick piers.  Built in 1890, the house is a distinctive combination of Queen Anne and Colonial Revival styling. It was built for D. O. Harton, a prominent local businessman.

The house was listed on the National Register of Historic Places in 1979.

See also
National Register of Historic Places listings in Faulkner County, Arkansas

References

Houses on the National Register of Historic Places in Arkansas
Queen Anne architecture in Arkansas
Houses completed in 1890
Houses in Conway, Arkansas
National Register of Historic Places in Faulkner County, Arkansas
Individually listed contributing properties to historic districts on the National Register in Arkansas